Boyne Island is a coastal town and locality in the Gladstone Region, Queensland, Australia. In the  the locality of Boyne Island had a population of 4,760 people.

Geography

It is located on the west bank of the Boyne River and, is a particular type of island called a holm, an island in a river or an estuary. It is bounded on the eastern side by the Boyne River, for about 4 km and the South Trees Inlet, on the southern, for 9 km, and western sides, for about 8 km Tannum Sands  is located on the eastern side of the mouth of the Boyne River spreading southward and is often referred to as Boyne Island's twin town.

History

The town was named for the Boyne River, which was named by John Oxley in 1823.  Originally the island was used for sheep grazing, this was followed by small crops, horticulture, fishing and timber.

St Luke's Anglican Church was built in 1924 on Sayre Crescent. It was designed  by Arthur Malpass. It was built from timber. Although the 1924 church building still stands, it was replaced in 1995 by a new brick church building called St Mark's adjacent to the old church building.

Boyne Island State School opened on 27 January 1953.

Heritage listings

Boyne Island has a number of heritage-listed sites, including:
 William Wyndham's gravesite, Wyndham Park Heritage Site, accessed between 36 and 38 Alkina Street
 former St Luke's Anglican Church, Sayre Crescent

Economy
Today Boyne Island is primarily a residential centre for the nearby Boyne Island aluminium smelter and Gladstone industries.
 
Australia's largest aluminium smelter, Boyne Smelters Ltd., is located north of the town separated by a buffer zone.

Education 

Boyne Island State School is a government primary (Prep-6) school for boys and girls at 151 Malpas Street. In 2017, the school had an enrolment of 361 students with  25 teachers (21 full-time equivalent) and 20 non-teaching staff (13 full-time equivalent). In 2018, the school had an enrolment of 384 students with 25 teachers (23 full-time equivalent) and 21 non-teaching staff (13 full-time equivalent). It includes a special education program.

Boyne Island Environmental Education Centre is an Outdoor and Environmental Education Centre at 61 Malpas Street. It offers hands-on activities for students to learn about natural coastal, marine and reef environments of the area and to understand human use of these areas.

There is no secondary school in Boyne Island. The nearest government secondary school is Tannum Sands State High School in neighbouring Tannum Sands to the south-east.

Amenities

The 13 hole Boyne Island Tannum Sands Golf Course is located in Boyne Island adjacent to the Boyne River, in Jacaranda Drive. Hole 12 in particular is challenging, with out-of-bounds and water hazard in strategic places.

The Gladstone Regional Council operates a public library on Boyne Island at the corner of Wyndham & Hayes Avenue.

St Mark's Anglican Church is on the corner of Malpas Stand and  Sayre Crescent.

There are a number of parks in the locality, including:

 Bauhinia Street Park
 Boyne Island Conservation Park
 Bray Park
 Colyer Park
 Dennis Park Sports Complex
 Hayes Park
 Jacaranda Drive Park
 Kirrang Park
 Lions Park
 Malpas Park
 Wyndham Park Heritage Site

Events
Boyne Island is home to the Boyne Tannum Hookup, which is a large fishing event held on the Labour Day long weekend in May each year. The event is held at Bray Park, which is on the river near the skate park. This event is very popular, with more than 3,000 entrants.

Notable people
Natalya Diehm - Freestyle BMX competitor

References

External links 

 
 Community website

 
Coastal towns in Queensland
Towns in Queensland
Fishing communities in Australia
Gladstone Region
Localities in Queensland